Nemesis is an American hip-hop group formed in Dallas, Texas in the 1980s.  Members of the group included MC Azim, DJ Snake, Big Al, Joe Macc and Ron C. They are considered the first rap group from Dallas to enjoy popularity in the US and world-wide, thanks to their label, Profile Records. This label was well known for bringing out many popular East Coast hip hop releases including Run-DMC, Dr. Jeckyll & Mr. Hyde, and Dana Dane. Originally, Nemesis was called "Something Fresh" with group members included rappers MC Azim aka Azim Rashid, Bhumble Bee aka Bill Jackson and Eazy Roque aka Charles Roquemore.  They were later joined by DJ Snake aka Don Brown, Big Al aka Al English, Casanova Rock aka Sean Lett. The rappers from Hamilton Park and the DJs from Oak Cliff (both neighborhoods in Dallas) became part of the Dallas, Texas underground rap scene in the late 1980s and early 1990s.  Known for their funk-structured compositions and loud bass lines, the group debuted with the single "Oak Cliff" in 1987, and followed up with several albums on Profile Records from 1989-1995.

History
As Something Fresh, the group appeared regularly on KNON FM 90.9.  Initially, they appeared as guests on "Nippy Jones Freaky Fresh Friday afternoon show" and after teaming up with DJ Snake for music production, they were regulars on the "All Hardy Def Party" radio show which became the metroplex's hottest radio show at the time.  The radio show, which was hosted by DJ Snake, Big Al, and Casanova Rock, was most popular to young Dallas hip-hoppers who had no other options or outlets for rap music.  Every Wednesday night, from 9pm til Midnight, Dallas/Fort Worth listeners were deluged with local artists, local sounds along with underground beats.

Something Fresh became local stars and Bumble Bee, feeling that Something Fresh was a bit soft, decided to change their name to Nemesis.  DJ Snake is one of the earliest Dallas based hip-hop producers that began his career as a local DJ, before helping co-found the independent Get Off Me Records in 1987. DJ Snake released his first single "Oak Cliff / Snake Beats" and helped produce for the hip-hop collective group Nemesis starting in 1988. Nemesis released their first album entitled, To Hell and Back on their independent record label, Get Off Me Records.  Bumble Bee left the group shortly after they signed with Profile Records, due to creative and philosophical differences between himself and the producers.  Eazy Roque also left soon after. This left MC Azim behind as the lone MC with the group.  Big Al, one of the group's producer/deejays then manned a microphone in order to help complete the project, and reinvent the group's sound to feature more of bass oriented sound featuring beats by DJ Snake.  Azim left the group before the release of Nemesis' 1993 Temple of Boom and was replaced by the previously solo rapper Ron C.  Long-time member DJ Snake departed two years later in 1995, but the group moved forward with releasing The People Want Bass album without him.

The group's last known recording is 2000's, Munchies for Your Bass, Da Return (Out tha Trunk), which was developed by Big Al along with a cast of up and coming Dallas artists such as Mabooda, Thyra, Trill Gatez, Big Pharaoh, Throwed Johnson and more.  The lead single, "Hold Up", produced by Trill Gatez, received heavy regional radio play and this subsequently led to several offers from major record labels including Universal Music Group.  While on a promotional tour in Louisiana near Shreveport in late 2001, Big Al became ill during a performance.  He later died of natural causes.

Stylistically, they were inspired by many genres of music gangsta rap, Miami bass, metal as well as (in terms of lyrics) spirituality (inspired by Islam).
 
DJ Snake went on to produce, mix and master tracks for many major and local artists. He then moved to Atlanta, Georgia, to work along with Too Short on his new record label Nation Riders/Jive Records. He produced and mixed artist Too Short, Lil Jon and The Eastside Boys, Mc Breed, T.I., E-40, UGK, Slink Capone, Bone Crusher, Quint Black, P Diddy and many more.

After departing from Nemesis, DJ Snake released two albums along with DJ AK in the mid-1990s. Throughout that decade, DJ Snake played an important part in the Dallas - Ft. Worth hip-hop scene producing for many artists including P.K.O., Royal Flush, Ron C, Kottonmouth, Blofly and many other regional acts.

In the late 1990s, DJ Snake was invited to produce for Bay Area rapper Too Short and has continued to contribute to his recent releases. Although in recent years DJ Snake has become more of a national artist, he is still one of Dallas - Ft. Worth's leading hip-hop musicians.  DJ Snake worked on new music with Nemesis which was released on September 22, 2016.

Discography
 1988 To Hell and Back (Get Off Me Records)
 1989 To Hell and Back (Profile)
 1991 Munchies for Your Bass (Profile) (Re-release in 1995)
 1993 Temple of Boom (Profile)
 1995 The People Want Bass (Profile) (Re-release in 1997)
 2000 Munchies for Your Bass, Da Return (Out tha Trunk) (Mack Time Records)
 2006 Greatest Hits (Mack Time Records)
 2016 This Is Hip Hop (Get Off Me Records)

Further reading
All Music Guide to Hip-hop: The Definitive Guide to Rap & Hip-hop.

References

American hip hop groups
Profile Records artists